Midwest Values PAC (MVP) is a political action committee, or PAC, that was founded by political satirist, best selling author, radio host, and US Senator Al Franken in the fall of 2005.

Franken has successfully used his national reputation to draw in donations from thousands of individuals, including a number of celebrities such as Barbra Streisand, Nora Ephron, Tom Hanks, Larry David and Jimmy Smits. After less than one year of operation, MVP raised nearly $1,000,000.

MVP’s stated goal is "to provide financial and organizational support to progressive candidates, activists, and causes," and is centered on the values Franken learned growing up in Minnesota.

Through MVP Franken has contributed to national Democratic Party organizations, Minnesota U.S. Senate candidate Amy Klobuchar, and U.S. House candidates Coleen Rowley, Tim Walz, and Patty Wetterling.

In 2008, Franken, a Democrat, ran for the US Senate seat then held by Republican Norm Coleman. Coleman was elected to the seat in 2002 after Democrat Paul Wellstone died in a plane crash on October 25 of that year.  Franken has said that Wellstone was one of his political heroes, and Franken has frequently criticized Coleman.  After a long legal battle, the Minnesota Supreme Court ruled on June 30, 2009 that in fact, Franken had won the election and stated that he deserved for the Governor and Secretary of State to issue a Certificate of Election.

MVP’s short-term goal was to elect what it terms progressive Democrats, with a particular emphasis on retaking one or both of the houses of Congress in the 2006 mid-term election.

External links
Midwest Values PAC website
Al Franken's Official Website

Democratic Party (United States) organizations
United States political action committees